The Jumma people is a term usually referred to the minority tribal group of people of the Chittagong Hill Tracts region of Bangladesh, who claim a separate state called Jumma Land. They include the Chakma, Arakanese (Rakhine), Marma, Tripuri, Tanchangya, Chak, Pankho, Mru, Bawm, Lushai, Khyang, and Khumi.

The name Jumma ("jum farmer") is derived from jum cultivation, or the slash-and-burn method rain forest & razed hill farming . They are also known as Pahari, which simply means "hill people".

With the exception of the relatively well-integrated Chakma, Jumma people are native speakers of Tibeto-Burman languages, unrelated to the Bengali language spoken by ethnic Bengalis. They are religiously and culturally distinct as well, with most being Buddhist, some Hindu, and some are converted Christians and Muslims. In addition, they have retained some traditional religious practices.

History

Pakistan Period
During the construction of the Kaptai Dam, more than 18,000 families and 100,000 tribal people were evicted by then Pakistani president Ayub Khan without appropriate resettlement facilities or compensation. More than 40,000 Chakma tribals emigrated to Arunachal Pradesh, India. Consequently, the Jumma people began a grudge against the government due to their distress.

Bangladesh Liberation War
In 1971, most of the Jumma tribes were neutral or in support of Bangladeshi independence, with the exception of the majority of the Chakma people, who were against the independence of Bangladesh under the leadership of Chakma circle chief Raja Tridev Roy.

Independent Bangladesh
Between 1978 and 1990, the ruling military junta government saw the Jumma people (including Chakmas) as traitors and a potential risk for an independent Bangladesh. Allegedly, 400,000 Bengali homeless people were relocated in the Chittagong Hill Tracts with homes, arable land, and food rationing. It causes tension between Bengali & tribal groups. Between 1979 and 1997, over 15 major conflict took place between Bengali Muslim and minority tribes where government agencies have allegation to support Bengali people. Due to the outbreaks of violence, communal and social unrest, many fled to the Indian states of Mizoram and Tripura, or to Burma .

Peace negotiations were initiated in 1996 by prime minister Sheikh Hasina of the Awami League, the daughter of Sheikh Mujibur Rahman. The peace accord was finalized and formally signed on 2 December 1997.

References

Ethnic groups in Bangladesh
People from Chittagong Division
Chittagong Hill Tracts conflict
.
.
.